Laurel is a city in Marshall County, Iowa, United States. The population was 220 at the time of the 2020 census.

History
Laurel was platted in 1880 by Conrad Weissenburger, and it was incorporated in 1902. The city was named after Laurel, Ohio, by settler Rufus Archerd.

Geography
Laurel is located at  (41.883720, -92.922906).

Education
East Marshall Community School District serves the community. The district was established on July 1, 1992 by the merger of the LDF and SEMCO school districts.

Notable residents
 Gertrude Baniszewski, convicted murderer of Sylvia Likens; lived as a recluse after her release and died of lung cancer.
 Esther Dendel (1910–2002), non-fiction writer
Lt. Colonel Phyllis L. Propp Fowle, first female Judge Advocate General's Corps officer

Demographics

2010 census
As of the census of 2010, there were 239 people, 109 households, and 64 families living in the city. The racial makeup of the city was 98.7% White, 0.4% African American, 0.4% Asian, and 0.4% from two or more races. Hispanic or Latino of any race were 2.1% of the population.

There were 109 households, of which 29.4% had children under the age of 18 living with them, 37.6% were married couples living together, 14.7% had a female householder with no husband present, 6.4% had a male householder with no wife present, and 41.3% were non-families. 38.5% of all households were made up of individuals, and 19.3% had someone living alone who was 65 years of age or older. The average household size was 2.19 and the average family size was 2.89.

The median age in the city was 43.8 years. 25.5% of residents were under the age of 18; 5.4% were between the ages of 18 and 24; 20.9% were from 25 to 44; 30.1% were from 45 to 64; and 18% were 65 years of age or older. The gender makeup of the city was 49.8% male and 50.2% female.

2000 census
As of the census of 2000, there were 266 people, 109 households, and 70 families living in the city. The racial makeup of the city was 96.24% White, 0.38% Native American, 1.13% Pacific Islander, and 2.26% from two or more races. Hispanic or Latino of any race were 2.63% of the population.

There were 109 households, out of which 26.6% had children under the age of 18 living with them, 54.1% were married couples living together, 7.3% had a female householder with no husband present, and 34.9% were non-families. 32.1% of all households were made up of individuals, and 20.2% had someone living alone who was 65 years of age or older. The average household size was 2.44 and the average family size was 3.00.

In the city, the population was spread out, with 26.3% under the age of 18, 4.9% from 18 to 24, 25.9% from 25 to 44, 25.9% from 45 to 64, and 16.9% who were 65 years of age or older. The median age was 40 years. For every 100 females, there were 97.0 males. For every 100 females age 18 and over, there were 96.0 males.

The median income for a household in the city was $32,031, and the median income for a family was $38,125. Males had a median income of $30,208 versus $17,188 for females. The per capita income for the city was $14,980. About 1.4% of families and 7.0% of the population were below the poverty line, including 9.2% of those under the age of eighteen and 12.2% of those 65 or over.

References

Cities in Iowa
Cities in Marshall County, Iowa
Populated places established in 1880
1880 establishments in Iowa